Robbie David Cundy (born 30 May 1997) is an English professional footballer who plays as a defender for Barnsley.

Playing career
Released from Aston Villa's youth system, he began his career at hometown club Oxford United, and had loan spells in the Southern League with Daventry Town and Chesham United in 2015. He made his senior debut for the "Yellows" on 11 November 2015, in a 2–0 Football League Trophy victory over Dagenham & Redbridge at Victoria Road. The following month he joined National League North side Gloucester City on a loan deal, which was later extended until the end of the 2015–16 season.

Following the end of a loan to Oxford City during the first half of the 2016–17 season, Cundy was loaned to Southport for a month. He was released by Oxford United at the end of the season. After spending pre-season with Kidderminster Harriers, Cundy re-signed for National South side Gloucester City

Cundy won the National League North's player of the month award in February 2016. He attended Fitzharrys Secondary School.

In the summer of 2017 he re-joined former loan club Gloucester City.

After the conclusion of the 2018–19 season, in which he made 48 appearances in all competitions for Bath City, and won the clubs' Supporters' Player of the Year, Players' Player of the Year, and Manager's Player of the Year Awards, Cundy signed for Championship side Bristol City on a two-year contract, with an option of another additional year.

Following his arrival at Bristol City, Jerry Gill, manager of Bath City, said [about Robbie Cundy]: 'He was by far one of the best centre-backs in the league and he deservedly won all the awards at our end of season dinner."

On 25 January 2021, Cundy joined League One side Gillingham on loan for the remainder of the 2020-21 season.

Career statistics

References

External links
 

1997 births
Living people
English footballers
Association football defenders
Oxford United F.C. players
Daventry Town F.C. players
Chesham United F.C. players
Gloucester City A.F.C. players
Oxford City F.C. players
Southport F.C. players
Bath City F.C. players
Bristol City F.C. players
Exeter City F.C. players
Torquay United F.C. players
Cambridge United F.C. players
Southern Football League players
English Football League players
National League (English football) players